Harald Wigaard (born 17 May 1944) is a retired Norwegian gymnast. He competed at the  1964 Summer Olympics in all individual artistic gymnastics events. His best achievement was fifth place on the pommel horse.

References

1944 births
Living people
Gymnasts at the 1964 Summer Olympics
Norwegian male artistic gymnasts
Olympic gymnasts of Norway
Sportspeople from Oslo
20th-century Norwegian people